Ambient backscatter, also known as RF backscatter, uses existing radio frequency signals, such as radio, television and mobile telephony, to transmit data without a battery or power grid connection.  Each such device uses an antenna to pick up an existing signal and convert it into tens to hundreds of microwatts of electricity.  It uses that power to modify and reflect the signal with encoded data. Antennas on other devices, in turn, detect that signal and can respond accordingly.

Circuit sizes can be as small as 1 sq. mm. Later implementation uses Wi-Fi, Bluetooth, FM radio and LoRa transmissions. There exists technology to extend backscatter communication range up-to 3.4 kilometers while consuming 70 μW power at the backscatter tag.

This approach would let mobile and other devices communicate without being turned on. It would also allow unpowered sensors to communicate, allowing them to function in places where external power cannot be conveniently supplied.

In 2021, researchers integrated RF backscatter with Li-Fi to achieve greater range via PassiveLiFi.

See also 
 Backscatter

References

External links

 

Ambient Backscatter: Wireless Communication Out of Thin Air
Turbocharging Ambient Backscatter Communication
Ambient Backscatter

Survey of Ambient Backscatter

Wireless networking hardware
Wireless sensor network
Energy harvesting